In mathematics, the incomplete Bessel functions are types of special functions which act as a type of extension from the complete-type of Bessel functions.

Definition
The incomplete Bessel functions are defined as the same delay differential equations of the complete-type Bessel functions:

And the following suitable extension forms of delay differential equations from that of the complete-type Bessel functions:

Where the new parameter  defines the integral bound of the upper-incomplete form and lower-incomplete form of the modified Bessel function of the second kind:

Properties

 for integer 

 for non-integer 

 for non-integer 
 for non-integer

Differential equations
 satisfies the inhomogeneous Bessel's differential equation

Both  and  satisfy the partial differential equation

Integral representations

References

External links

Special hypergeometric functions